Pseudatemelia elsae is a moth of the family Oecophoridae. It was described by Svensson, 1982. It is found in Fennoscandia, Russia, the Baltic region, the Czech Republic, Slovakia, Austria, Hungary and Italy.

The wingspan  is 18–22 mm. Adults have been recorded in June and July.

References

Moths described in 1982
Amphisbatinae
Moths of Europe